Peter Michael Harman (11 December 1943 – 14 August 2014) was a British historian who was Professor of the History of Science at the University of Lancaster.

Career 
Harman was born in Leeds, Yorkshire, the son of Herbert and Gertrude (nee Harris) Heimann. He studied at Oriel College, Oxford and later at the University of Leeds. He was Assistant Lecturer at the University of Glasgow (1969–70) and at the University of Cambridge (1970–74) where he was a Fellow of Clare Hall (1971–74), before being appointed Lecturer at the University of Lancaster in 1974. He was appointed Reader in 1993 and Professor in 1999 until his retirement in 2007.

Harman was a Visiting Scholar at Harvard University (1988–89 and 1990–91). As Zeeman Professor of the History of Physics at the University of Amsterdam in 1995, his lectures were on the topic of The Natural Philosophy of James Clerk Maxwell and were later published.

Harman's research was focussed chiefly on the history of natural philosophy and physics in the 18th and 19th centuries, covering the period after Isaac Newton, with his most important work being his research on the physicist James Clerk Maxwell, which was supported by the Royal Society, the Leverhulme Trust (1986–87), the National Science Foundation (1988–89 and 1990–91), and the Arts and Humanities Research Board.

Bibliography

References 

1943 births
2014 deaths
People from Leeds
Alumni of the University of Oxford
Alumni of the University of Leeds
Academics of the University of Glasgow
Academics of the University of Cambridge
Harvard University faculty
Academics of Lancaster University
20th-century British historians
21st-century British historians